Boxwood Lodge is a historic hunting retreat and national historic district located near Mocksville, Davie County, North Carolina. The district encompasses 8 contributing buildings, 1 contributing site, and 4 contributing structures on a rural estate including a manor house. It was developed between 1911 and 1931 by William Rabb Craig (1870-1931), a wealthy cotton and sugar broker.  The manor house was built between 1933 and 1934, and is a two-story, "H"-plan, brick Colonial Revival dwelling designed by the architectural firm Delano & Aldrich.  Other notable resources include the grounds of Boxwood Lodge, greenhouse (c. 1940), log cabin (1932-1933, 1940s), great barn (1910s), feed / grain house (c. 1940), and entrance piers (1934).

It was added to the National Register of Historic Places in 1995.

References

Buildings and structures in Davie County, North Carolina
Houses completed in 1934
Houses on the National Register of Historic Places in North Carolina
Historic districts on the National Register of Historic Places in North Carolina
National Register of Historic Places in Davie County, North Carolina
Delano & Aldrich buildings
Colonial Revival architecture in North Carolina
1934 establishments in North Carolina